Albertus Eckhoff (24 June 1875 – 1 April 1949) was a New Zealand cricketer. He played fifteen first-class matches for Otago between 1899 and 1915.

Eckhoff was born at Dunedin in 1875. He worked as a blacksmith.

References

External links
 

1875 births
1949 deaths
New Zealand cricketers
Otago cricketers
Cricketers from Dunedin